Spean Bridge railway station is a railway station serving the village of Spean Bridge in the Highland region of Scotland. This station is on the West Highland Line, between Roy Bridge and Fort William, sited  from Craigendoran Junction, near Helensburgh. ScotRail manage the station and operate most services, along with Caledonian Sleeper.

History 

The station opened on 7 August 1894 and was laid out with two platforms, one on either side of a crossing loop. There were sidings on the north side of the station. The station buildings were designed by James Miller.

Between 1903 and December 1933, there was a branch line from this station which offered service north up the Great Glen to Fort Augustus, terminating at a pier on Loch Ness. The North British railway extended Spean Bridge adding a bay platform at the west end at a cost of £303 0s 5d to accommodate Invergarry and Fort Augustus Railway trains. The signalling instruments were moved from the I&FA box at the junction to the booking office at the insistence of the Board of Trade inspector.

The I&FA line was not successful. Passenger services stopped in 1933 and the line was eventually abandoned completely in 1947.

The station was host to a LNER camping coach from 1936 to 1939. A camping coach was also positioned here by the Scottish Region from 1961 until all camping coaches in the region were withdrawn at the end of the 1969 season.

Signalling 

From the time of its opening in 1894, the West Highland Railway was worked throughout by the electric token system. Alterations in connection with the construction of the line to Fort Augustus saw the original Spean Bridge signal box replaced by two new boxes in 1901. Spean Bridge Junction box was subsidiary to Spean Bridge Station box. The Junction box closed on 20 September 1921. The most recent signal box at Spean Bridge, which opened on 28 August 1949, was located on the Up platform (which is now the Down platform). It contained 30 levers.

Spean Bridge lost all its semaphore signals on 2 March 1986, in preparation for Radio Electronic Token Block (RETB) signalling. This resulted in the closure of Spean Bridge signal box and others on that part of the line. The RETB is controlled from a Signalling Centre at Banavie railway station.

The Train Protection & Warning System was installed in 2003.

Facilities 
The station buildings are on platform 1, which passengers can use for shelter, whilst platform 2 only has a rudimentary glass structure. The help point is on platform 1, and the car park and bike racks are also adjacent to this platform. Both platforms have step-free access. As there are no facilities to purchase tickets, passengers must buy one in advance, or from the guard on the train.

Passenger volume 

The statistics cover twelve month periods that start in April.

Services
Sundays see two trains per day call each way, as well as the southbound sleeper. The sleeper also carries seated coaches and thus can be used by regular travellers to/from Glasgow Queen Street (Low Level) and Edinburgh.

References

External links 

 Video and commentary on Spean Bridge railway station

Railway stations in Highland (council area)
Former North British Railway stations
Railway stations in Great Britain opened in 1894
Railway stations served by ScotRail
Railway stations served by Caledonian Sleeper
Category C listed buildings in Highland (council area)
James Miller railway stations
Listed railway stations in Scotland